Cercophaninae is a subfamily of the family Saturniidae, and was, until recently, treated as a separate family, Cercophanidae.

This subfamily contains the following genera:

Cercophana C. Felder, 1862
Janiodes Jordan, 1924
Microdulia Jordan, 1924
Neocercophana Izquierdo, 1895

References

 
Saturniidae